The 1989 Nippon Professional Baseball season was the 40th season of operation for the league.

Regular season standings

Central League

Pacific League

Japan Series

See also
1989 Major League Baseball season

References

 
1989 in baseball
1989 in Japanese sport